Greta Harris is an administrator and politician from the Pacific Republic of Nauru.

Professional background

Harris has served as Director of Development Policy at the Republic of Nauru's Department of Finance and Economic Planning.

In 2006 she was a co-author of the Republic of Nauru's National Sustainable Development Strategies: National Assessment Report.

2010 elections to the Parliament of Nauru

In 2010 Ms. Harris entered politics when she announced that she would be standing for the Parliament of Nauru in the elections called by President of Nauru Marcus Stephen for April 24, 2010.

On April 20 a statement made by Ms. Harris condemning the allegedly obstructive behaviour of the Opposition which had led President Stephen to dissolve Parliament was widely noted.

References

See also

 Politics of Nauru

Living people
Nauruan women in politics
21st-century women politicians
Year of birth missing (living people)